James Barr Barclay (born 6 March 1933) is a New Zealand field hockey player. He competed in the men's tournament at the 1960 Summer Olympics.

References

External links
 

1933 births
Living people
New Zealand male field hockey players
Olympic field hockey players of New Zealand
Field hockey players at the 1960 Summer Olympics
People from Te Awamutu
Sportspeople from Waikato